Zac Langdon (born 13 November 1995) is a former professional Australian rules footballer player for the West Coast Eagles in the Australian Football League (AFL). He Played for Dampier Sharks. He was then drafted by Greater Western Sydney with their fifth selection and fifty-sixth overall in the 2017 national draft.

At the conclusion of the 2020 AFL season, Langdon returned to his home state of Western Australia, after being traded to the West Coast Eagles.

Langdon was delisted at the end of the 2022 AFL season with a year still to run on his contract.

References

External links

1995 births
Living people
Greater Western Sydney Giants players
Claremont Football Club players
Australian rules footballers from Western Australia
West Coast Eagles players
West Coast Eagles (WAFL) players